The Summit Building is a twelve-story, all-glass high-rise building located at 300 North Marienfield in the business sector of Downtown Midland, Texas. The building is constructed with a more modern look than most of Midland's downtown buildings. In 2008, the Summit Building became the first building in the Midland area to be depicted on Google Earth in 3D mode.

References
 http://n.b5z.net/i/u/10000471/i/The_Summit.pdf
 http://www.barrypopik.com/index.php/new_york_city/entry/tall_city_midland_nickname/

Skyscraper office buildings in Midland, Texas

Office buildings completed in 1981